Julia Biedermann (born 15 March 1967) is a German television actress.

She has made 29 appearances mostly in television since 1981. In 1993 she appeared in the Austrian set comedy film Hochwürden erbt das Paradies.

Selected filmography
 Manni, der Libero (1982, TV series)
 Mandara (1983, TV miniseries)
 Ich heirate eine Familie (1983–1986, TV series)
 Praxis Bülowbogen (1987–1990, TV series)
 Ein Schloß am Wörthersee (1990–1991, TV series)
 Der Landarzt (1992–1993, 1996, TV series)
 Hochwürden erbt das Paradies (1993, TV film)
 Blankenese (1994, TV series)
 Marienhof (1995, TV series)

References

External links
 

1967 births
Living people
Actresses from Berlin
German television actresses
20th-century German actresses
Ich bin ein Star – Holt mich hier raus! participants